The following compilation lists all airports in Poland with at least one paved runway (asphalt, concrete or bitumen). It encompasses airports of various types and of varying importance and usage. Only the paved runways are specified, although many airports exploit their grass runways solely or equally frequently. Many airports listed here are former military airfields that are either unused, closed, disintegrated or liquidated. On the other hand, many important unpaved airfields are not listed. Those are listed at "Airports in Poland with unpaved runways". It does not list highway strips either, those can be found at "Highway strips in Poland".

See also
List of airports in Poland
List of airports in Poland with unpaved runways
List of airports

Paved